Amina Barcham Bakhit (born 14 November 1990) is a Sudanese middle-distance runner.  At the 2012 Summer Olympics, she competed in the Women's 800 metres.

She won gold at the 2007 Pan Arab Games in the 800 m and bronze in the 10,000 m at the 2011 Pan Arab Games.

Doping case
Bakhit tested positive for norandrosterone at a competition in Sollentuna, Sweden in June 2009 and was subsequently handed a two-year ban from sports. The ban ended 16 July 2011.

References

External links
 
 

1990 births
Living people
Athletes (track and field) at the 2012 Summer Olympics
Doping cases in athletics
Olympic athletes of Sudan
Sudanese female middle-distance runners
Sudanese sportspeople in doping cases
World Athletics Championships athletes for Sudan
Athletes (track and field) at the 2016 Summer Olympics
21st-century Sudanese women